The 2006–07 Eastern Michigan Eagles men's basketball team represented Eastern Michigan University during the 2006–07 NCAA Division I men's basketball season. The Eagles, led by 2nd year head coach Charles E. Ramsey, played their home games at the Eastern Michigan University Convocation Center and were members of the West Division of the Mid-American Conference. They finished the season 13–19, 6–10 in MAC play. They team finished 4th in the MAC West. They were knocked out in the 2nd round of the MAC Tournament by Toledo The team captains were Carlos Medlock, Craig Cashen.

Roster

Source:

Coaching staff

Schedule

Source:

Awards
MAC All-Freshman team
 Brandon Bowdry  
MAC Player of the Week
 Nov. 10,2006 Carlos Medlock
 Jan. 01,2007 Jesse Bunkley
 Nov. 13,2007 Carlos Medlock  
E Club Hall of Fame Inductee
 Al Jagutis

Thompson Challenge All Tournament Team
 Carlos Medlock
Golden Bear Classic All Tournament Team
 Brandon Bowdry

References

Eastern Michigan Eagles men's basketball seasons
Eastern Michigan
2006 in sports in Michigan
2007 in sports in Michigan